The Big Story is an American radio and television crime drama which dramatized the true stories of real-life newspaper reporters. The only continuing character was the narrator, Bob Sloane.

Radio

Sponsored by Pall Mall cigarettes, the program began on NBC Radio on April 2, 1947. With Lucky Strike cigarettes sponsoring the last two seasons, it was broadcast until March 23, 1955.

The radio series was top rated, rivaling Bing Crosby's Philco Radio Time.

Produced by Barnard J. Prockter, the shows were scripted by Gail Ingram, Arnold Pearl and Max Ehrlich. Tom Vietor and Harry Ingram directed the series. Gail and Harry Ingram were husband and wife. The theme was taken from Ein Heldenleben ("A Hero's Life"), a tone poem by Richard Strauss.

Prockter was inspired to create the program after hearing about a man who was freed from a life sentence in jail by the work of two newspaper reporters in Chicago. Most of the stories in the show dealt with stories about closed cases. Ross Eaman, in his book, Historical Dictionary of Journalism, wrote that the program was "originally intended to honor reporters ignored by Pulitzer committees ...." Jim Cox also cited that plan in his book, Radio Crime Fighters: More Than 300 Programs from the Golden Age.

Each week the program recognized the reporter who wrote the story on which that episode was based and the newspaper in which the story appeared. The reporter received $500, was interviewed on the air and was acknowledged in the introduction, as in this example:Pall Mall, famous big cigarette, presents The Big Story, another in a thrilling series based on true experiences of newspaper reporters. Tonight, to Russ Wilson of the Des Moines Tribune goes the Pall Mall award for The Big Story. Now, the authentic and exciting story of "The Case of the Ambitious Hobo."

Television

The radio series was adapted for television where it debuted on NBC on September 16, 1949. The series continued to air on NBC until June 28, 1957, after which it appeared in syndication until 1958. The half-hour program was hosted by Robert Sloane, Norman Rose, Ben Grauer, and, finally, Burgess Meredith.

Guest stars included:
James Dean
Sam Jaffe
Jack Klugman
Diane Ladd
Martin Landau
Lee Marvin
Walter Matthau
Lois Nettleton
Leslie Nielsen
Steve McQueen
Warren Oates
Anthony Perkins
Mark Rydell 
Jerry Stiller
Joyce Van Patten
Jack Warden
Martin Balsam

Among the episodes is "Harold Faller of the Huntington Advertiser of West Virginia" (January 19, 1951), starring Francis De Sales in his first screen appearance as newspaperman Harold Faller of Huntington, West Virginia.

The theme music was two of the main themes from the tone poem Ein Heldenleben (A Hero's Life) by the German composer Richard Strauss. The series was nominated for a Primetime Emmy Award in 1953.

The series finished at #25 in the Nielsen ratings for the 1950–1951 season, #23 for 1952-1953 and #29 for 1953–1954.

See also

Bright Star
Ford Theater
Nightbeat

References

Sies, Luther F. Encyclopedia of American Radio 1920-1960.  Jefferson, NC: McFarland, 2000. 
Terrace, Vincent (1981). The Radio's Golden Years: Encyclopedia of Radio Programs, 1930-1960.  A. S. Barnes.

Listen to
Same Time, Same Station: The Big Story (January 11, 1950)
Streaming episodes of The Big Story from Old Time Radio Researchers Group Library

External links
Jerry Haendiges Vintage Radio Logs: The Big Story
 
The Big Story at CVTA with episode list

1947 radio programme debuts
1955 radio programme endings
1949 American television series debuts
1958 American television series endings
1940s American radio programs
1950s American radio programs
1940s American crime drama television series
1950s American crime drama television series
1940s American anthology television series
1950s American anthology television series
American radio dramas
Black-and-white American television shows
English-language television shows
First-run syndicated television programs in the United States
NBC original programming
Television series about journalism
NBC radio programs
Radio programs adapted into television shows
Television articles with incorrect naming style